James Leo Meehan (1891 – 1943) was an American film director and screenwriter. He married the daughter of writer Gene Stratton-Porter, and adapted several of his mother-in-law's novels for the screen.

He directed Campus Sweethearts (US 1930 RKO, 27 min, only shown at State Lake, Chicago - Natural Vision also shown in 35 mm) starring Rudy Vallee with Ginger Rogers among the cast. It is one of the early wide-gauge films.

Selected filmography

 Michael O'Halloran (1923)
 A Girl of the Limberlost (1924)
 The Keeper of the Bees (1925)
 Laddie (1926)
 The Magic Garden (1927)
 Naughty Nanette (1927)
 The Harvester (1927)
 Judgment of the Hills (1927)
 Little Mickey Grogan (1927)
 Wallflowers (1928)
 The Little Yellow House (1928)
 Campus Sweethearts (1930)

References

Bibliography
 Munden, Kenneth White. The American Film Institute Catalog of Motion Pictures Produced in the United States, Part 1. University of California Press, 1997.

External links

1891 births
1943 deaths
American film directors
People from Illinois
20th-century American screenwriters